Ahmed Sareer (born 28 August 1965) is a Maldivian diplomat who served as Permanent Representative of the Maldives to the United Nations from 2012 to 2017.

He has a Master of Arts degree in foreign affairs and trade from Monash University in Australia. He first joined the Maldivian Foreign Ministry in April 1986, as a civil servant. He served in a junior diplomatic posting in Colombo, Sri Lanka for a year (1988-1989), before returning to work at the ministry, rising to the position of Assistant Under-Secretary in 1992. He was then appointed chargé d’affaires at the Maldives' Permanent Mission to the United Nations, serving from 1992 to 1993. Returning to the Maldives, he eventually became Deputy Director for Foreign Relations in the Ministry of Foreign Affairs. From 2000 to 2003, he was Director at the Secretariat of the South Asian Association for Regional Cooperation in Kathmandu, Nepal.

Having risen in the ranks of the Foreign Ministry, he subsequently served as Deputy High Commissioner for the Maldives in Sri Lanka, chargé d'affaires at the Maldivian mission to the European Union (2008), Deputy High Commissioner to the United Kingdom (2008-2009). From 2009 to 2012, he was High Commissioner to Bangladesh; in February 2012, he became Ambassador to the United States. On 20 December 2012, he presented his credentials to United Nations Secretary-General Ban Ki-moon, as the Maldives Permanent Representative to the United Nations. As chairman of the Alliance of Small Island States from 2015 to 2017, he was a key figure in negotiating the Paris Agreement and for adopting the target of limiting temperature increase to 1.5 °C. His tenure as Permanent Representative ended on 5 July 2017.

On 18 July 2017 he was appointed Foreign Secretary in the Ministry of Foreign Affairs, succeeding in that role Dr Ali Naseer Mohamed, who was in turn appointed Permanent Representative to the United Nations and Ambassador to the United States. Since November 2018 he has been adviser to the Secretary-General of the Organization of the Islamic Conference.

He and his wife, Fathimath Athifa, are the parents of four children. He is a painter whose works have been publicly exhibited.

References

Maldivian diplomats
Permanent Representatives of the Maldives to the United Nations
Monash University alumni
1965 births
Living people
Ambassadors of the Maldives to the United States